Sammi Rotibi is a Nigerian-American film and television actor. His most notable roles are Rodney in Django Unchained and General Amajagh in Batman v Superman: Dawn of Justice. His acting idols are Sidney Poitier and Peter O'Toole.

Background 
Rotibi was born and grew up in Lagos, Nigeria. He attended schools in Nigeria; Miami, Florida; and Los Angeles, California. He is the youngest child of a large family. He decided to become an actor at 18 while working as a part-time bank teller in Miami when a client who owned a talent-agency suggested it as a profession to him.

Filmography

Film

Television

References

External links 
 

American people of Nigerian descent
Living people
Year of birth missing (living people)
Male actors from Lagos
Nigerian male film actors
Nigerian male television actors
American male film actors
American male television actors
20th-century Nigerian male actors
20th-century American male actors
21st-century Nigerian male actors
21st-century American male actors
20th-century births